Banderas may refer to:

People
Alberto Del Rio (Alberto Banderas), Mexican professional wrestler
Antonio Banderas (born 1960), Spanish actor
Josh Banderas (born 1995), American football player
Julie Banderas, American television news correspondent and weekend anchor for the Fox News Channel
Marco Banderas, Uruguayan-Spanish porn actor
Ricky Banderas, Puerto Rican professional wrestler

Places
Bahía de Banderas, a bay and a municipality in Mexico
Banderas River, a river in El Salvador
Banderas (TransMilenio), a mass transit station in Bogotá, Colombia

Music
Banderas (duo), a British female pop duo
Banderas, a 2016 album by L'Algérino